The Trees is a 2021 novel by American author Percival Everett, published by Graywolf Press.

Writing and development
To write the novel, Everett researched lynching in the United States. For this research, Everett purchased enough books dealing with elements of lynching to incidentally develop a "lynching section in [his] library". Everett attributes the humor in his novels, including in The Trees, to the influence of Mark Twain.

Reception and accolades

Reception
The novel received mostly favorable reviews. Mary F. Corey, in a positive review published by the Los Angeles Review of Books, wrote that the novel included a "Twainian level of wit and meanness". Joyce Carol Oates called it "[r]eally profound writing...about subjects of great tragic and political significance. Carole V. Bell, in a review published by NPR, also praised the novel, writing that the book is a  "combination of whodunnit, horror, humor and razor blade sharp insight".

Honors
Published in the UK by Influx Press, the novel was shortlisted for the 2022 Booker Prize that was announced on September 6, 2022. It also won the Anisfield-Wolf Book Award in 2022 for Fiction.

References

2021 American novels
Graywolf Press books
English-language novels
Lynching in the United States